False Positive is a 2022 Philippine television drama comedy fantasy series broadcast by GMA Network. Directed by Irene Villamor, it stars Glaiza de Castro and Xian Lim. It premiered on May 2, 2022 on the network's Telebabad line up replacing Widows' Web. The series concluded on May 27, 2022 with a total of 19 episodes. It was replaced by Bolera in its timeslot.

Cast and characters
Lead cast
 Glaiza de Castro as Alyanna "Yannie" Ramirez-dela Guardia
 Xian Lim as Edward dela Guardia

Supporting cast
 Herlene Budol as Maganda
 Buboy Villar as Malakas
 Yvette Sanchez as Paulina Dare
 Dianne dela Fuente as Maritess Soto
 Rochelle Pangilinan as Bernice Siodora
 Dominic Roco as Froilan Siodora
 Luis Hontiveros as Devon Rosales
 Tonton Gutierrez as Rodrigo dela Guardia
 Alma Concepcion as Marla dela Guardia
 Nova Villa as Mamerta "Mema" Ramirez

Episodes
<onlyinclude>
<onlyinclude>

References

External links
 
 

2022 Philippine television series debuts
2022 Philippine television series endings
Filipino-language television shows
GMA Network drama series
Philippine fantasy television series
Television shows set in the Philippines